The women's 100 metres event at the 1951 Pan American Games was held at the Estadio Monumental in Buenos Aires on 28 February and 1 March.

Medalists

Results

Heats
Held on 28 February

Semifinals
Held on 1 March

Final
Held on 1 March

References

Athletics at the 1951 Pan American Games
1951